The National Anthem of Karachay-Cherkessia is the national anthem of the Karachay-Cherkess Republic, a federal subject of Russia in the North Caucasus. The lyrics were written by Yusuf Sozarukov (1952–2008), and the music was composed by Aslan Daurov (1940–1999). The anthem was adopted on 9 April 1998 by Law of the KChR number 410-XXII "On the State Anthem of the Republic of Karachay-Cherkessia". The title of the song is "Древней Родиной горжусь я!", meaning "Ancient Homeland I am proud of!".

Lyrics

In Russian

In local languages

References 

Karachay-Cherkess
Karachay-Cherkessia
1998 songs
Regional songs
National anthems
National anthem compositions in G minor